Lakshmi Bai College may refer to:

 Maharani Laxmi Bai Govt. College of Excellence, a college in Gwalior
 Lakshmibai College, University of Delhi, a college in Delhi